Caudicornia is a genus of moths in the family Sesiidae.

Species
Caudicornia aurantia (Hampson, 1919)
Caudicornia flavicincta (Hampson, 1919)
Caudicornia flava (Xu & Liu, 1992)
Caudicornia tonkinensis Kallies & Arita, 2001
Caudicornia xanthopimpla Bryk, 1947

References

Sesiidae